Nomi Kaplan (born December 7, 1933) is a Lithuanian-Canadian photographer and artist.

The daughter of Bernard and Ndia Kaplan, she was born at Memel in Lithuania and moved to Ontario with her family in 1940. Kaplan settled in Vancouver in 1955. She was educated at Wayne State University, at the University of British Columbia and the Vancouver School of Art. She has taken post-graduate courses in art, photography, film and video production. Kaplan taught photography at the Emily Carr Institute of Art and Design from 1991 to 1994.

In 1972, she helped organize the first Women's Film Festival in Vancouver. She was a co-founder of the ReelFeelings collective which produced the film So Where's My Prince Already?, which screened at the 1973 New York Women's Film Festival.

Her work is included in private and public collections, including the Brooklyn Museum, the Canada Council Art Bank, the Canadian Museum of Contemporary Photography, the Art Gallery of Alberta and the Winnipeg Art Gallery.

References

External links 
 

1933 births
Living people
20th-century Canadian women artists
21st-century Canadian women artists
Lithuanian emigrants to Canada
University of British Columbia alumni
Wayne State University alumni